A.K. Sai J Saravanan Kumar is an Indian politician. He was elected to the Puducherry Legislative Assembly from Ossudu as a member of the Bharatiya Janata Party.

References 

Bharatiya Janata Party politicians from Puducherry
Puducherry MLAs 2021–2026
Puducherry politicians
Living people
Year of birth missing (living people)